Serangoon Road is an Australian-Singaporean television drama series which premiered on 22 September 2013 on the Australian Broadcasting Corporation (ABC) and HBO Asia. It is a detective noir drama set in the 1960s, revolving around Serangoon Road in Singapore. The 10-part series is a collaboration between ABC and HBO Asia and was filmed largely in Singapore. It was created by Paul D. Barron and directed by Peter Andrikidis and Tony Tilse.

The final episode of the series aired on 29 November 2013. Though the series received encouraging ratings, HBO has no plans for a second season.

Plot

The series is set in Singapore during the mid-1960s, a tumultuous time in the island's history. The island state is at a crossroads as it is about to break away from the newly created federation of Malaysia and become an independent country. The British colonial rulers are gradually pulling out of the country, while racial and political tensions are running high and the ensuing riots are threatening national security. Communist insurgency movements are active in neighbouring countries and trying to push into Singapore.

The protagonist Sam Callaghan is an Australian living in Singapore. As a child, he was interned in Changi Prison by the occupying Japanese and later joined the military, serving in Malaya. He now runs an import/export business with his partner Kang. Sam agrees to help neighbour Patricia Cheng at her detective agency after her husband is killed while working on a case.

Cast
Don Hany as Sam Callaghan
Joan Chen as Patricia Cheng, runs the Cheng Detective Agency after the death of her husband.
Michael Dorman as Conrad Harrison, young American CIA agent.
Maeve Dermody as Claire Simpson, married to Frank, and having an affair with Sam.
Rachael Blake as Lady Tuckworth 
Ario Bayu as Inspector Amran
Tony Martin as Macca, Australian journalist.
Nicholas Bell as Maxwell Black
Jeremy Lindsay Taylor as Frank Simpson, expat businessman, Claire's husband.
P.J. Lane
Pamelyn Chee as Su Ling
Chin Han as Kay Song
Alaric Tay as Kang
Cleave Williams as Nate Crosby
Shane Briant as Major Miller
Valentine Payen as Young Sam's Mother
Edmund Chen as James Lim
Russell Wong as Winston Cheng
Christian Matthew Wong as XiaoQiang

Episodes

International broadcasts

References

External links
Serangoon Road – HBO

Television shows set in Singapore
2013 Australian television series debuts
APRA Award winners
Australian drama television series
Australian Broadcasting Corporation original programming
English-language television shows
HBO Asia original programming